Thomas Banester (by 1529–71), of London was an English politician.

He was a Member (MP) of the Parliament of England for Reigate in 1558.

References

Year of birth missing
1571 deaths
English MPs 1558
Politicians from London